Aleksey Matveyev (born 30 October 1970) is a Russian swimmer. He competed in the men's 100 metre breaststroke at the 1988 Summer Olympics.

References

1970 births
Living people
Russian male swimmers
Olympic swimmers of the Soviet Union
Swimmers at the 1988 Summer Olympics
Swimmers from Moscow
Soviet male swimmers